Retznei is a former municipality in the district of Leibnitz in the Austrian state of Styria. Since the 2015 Styria municipal structural reform, it is part of the municipality Ehrenhausen an der Weinstraße.

Geography
Retznei lies on the right bank of the Mur river below its confluence with the Sulm about 6 km southeast of Leibnitz.

References

Cities and towns in Leibnitz District